Gerardina Trovato (born 27 May 1967) is an Italian singer-songwriter.

Background 
Born in Catania, Trovato started her career as backing vocalist, then, put under contract by singer-discographer Caterina Caselli, she took part at the 1993 Sanremo Music Festival with the song "Non ho più la mia città", ranking second in the newcomers section. The song achieved critical and commercial success and launched her career. In the Summer she was the opening act in Zucchero Fornaciari's concerts.  

The following year Trovato come back to the Festival, this time in the Big Artists section, and ranked fourth with the song "Non è un film". In May, se toured with the tenor-singer Andrea Bocelli; the couple also made a duet, "Vivere", written by the same Trovato and included in the Bocelli's album Romanza. 

In 1996, Trovato published her third album, Ho trovato Gerardina, that led by the singles "Amori amori" and "Piccoli già grandi" obtained a good commercial success.  In 2000, she made her third appearance at the Sanremo Festival with the autobiographical song "Gechi e vampiri".  In 2005, Trovato took part at the musical reality show Music Farm from which she was eliminated in the second episode.  In 2012, it was announced that the real life events of the singer would be the subject of a documentary film directed by Giacomo Franciosa.

Discography

Album 
 1993 - Gerardina Trovato 
 1994 - Non è un film 
 1996 - Ho Trovato Gerardina
 1997 - Il sole dentro 
 2000 - Gechi, vampiri e altre storie 
 2005 - La collezione completa
 2008 - I sogni (EP)

Singles 
 1993 - Lasciami libere le mani
 1993 - Ma non ho più la mia città 
 1993 - Sognare, sognare/ Just dreams
 1994 - Angeli a metà
 1994 - Non è un film
 1994 - Vivere (with Andrea Bocelli)
 1996 - Piccoli già grandi
 1996 - Amori amori
 1996 - Una storia già finita
 1996 - E' già (with Renato Zero)
 1998 - Il sole dentro
 2000 - Gechi e vampiri
 2000 - Mammone
 2003 - M'ama, non m'ama (with VerbaVolant)
 2006 - Un'altra estate
 2008 - I sogni
 2011 - I Nuovi Mille (with Lucariello)

References

External links 

 Gerardina Trovato at Discogs

1967 births
Italian women singers
Living people
Musicians from Catania
Pop rock singers
Italian singer-songwriters